Thomas Lechford (c. 1590 – 1644) was an English lawyer and author who wrote about his experiences in the Massachusetts Bay Colony.

Born in London, Lechford emigrated to Boston in 1638.  He became the first man to practice law in New England.

Lechford returned to England in 1641, very dissatisfied with his experiences in the colony. Lechford published Plaine Dealing, or Newes from New England (London, 1642), and New England's Advice to Old England (1644). A new edition of Plaine Dealing with notes by J. Hammond Trumbull was published in 1867.

The title of the short article in Appleton's is "Lechford, Thomas".

References

 Appleton's cyclopedia of American biography, vol. 3 (Grinnell - Lockwood), by Wilson, James Grant, 1832-1914, ed; Fiske, John, 1842-1901, joint ed. (New York: Appleton, 1887), p. 651

1590 births
1644 deaths
Kingdom of England emigrants to Massachusetts Bay Colony
Lawyers from the Thirteen Colonies
Writers from the Thirteen Colonies
Lawyers from the Kingdom of England
Writers from the Kingdom of England